Locational astrology (sometimes referred to as astrogeography or locality astrology) is any of various types of astrology that factor in specific locations of the Earth.  The different types also carry a range of astrological techniques.

Astrogeography
The topic of astrological geography is the astrological study of the lands, the features, the inhabitants, and the phenomena of the Earth.
The origins of astrogeography may possibly go back to the roots of astrology in Mesopotamian Culture. Some relation between zodiac signs and cardinal points is highly probable to have been established for astrological weather forecasts and other purposes of prediction. 
Nicholas Campion names Marcus Manilius (1st century) and Claudius Ptolemaeus (2nd century) to be the first authors to deliver a system of rulership of zodiac signs for regions. Others are Al-Biruni (11th century), William Lilly (17th century), Raphael (19th century), Green and Sepharial (20th century). 
An important systematic approach to astrogeography was developed by various astrologers such as Sepharial (Walter Gorn Old) in England, and A.M. Grimm in Germany. Both these systems assume that the Greenwich Meridian in metropolitan London has a 0° Aries fixed local MC, leaving the various regions of the globe to correspond with the 12 signs of the zodiac. There are subtle differences between the system of Sepharial and Grimm which are not noticeable in many classical astrology methods, but may be noticeable in precision methods such as those of Uranian astrology or cosmobiology. The Sepharial system was later popularized by Canadian astrologer Chris McRae, and American astrologer Joyce Wehrman.  The Canadian astrologer L. Edward Johndro also worked with this method at various points throughout the 1930s and later years, and vacillated between the starting reference point at Greenwich and one near the greater pyramids of Egypt; there is controversy over which system he actually decided upon in later years. 
In the course of the development of computer technology which made it easier to calculate more elaborate astrogeographical maps the so-called Andersen system was published in 1974. It included 11 newly developed world maps valid for one planet each. A more complex astrogeographical world mapping system based on the holographic structural model and astrological field study through comparison of the features of the landscape developed in astrological geomancy was published by Georg Stockhorst in 2009 calculating 6 size levels of fields nested inside one another.

Astrological cartography
The topic of astrological cartography is the astrological study of the relationship of individuals such as subjects or objects to places on Earth by the projection of valid horoscopes onto the Earth's surface. For example, a simple approach applies the 360° and minutes of latitude and longitude (each) to the 12 zodiacs of the wheel chart.

The most popular method in astrological cartography was based on findings by Don Neroman, Gustav Schwickert, Cyril Fagan, Roy Charles Firebrace and Donald A. Bradley and developed from about 1930 until the 1960s. In the 1970s and 1980s it was further developed and made popular by Jim Lewis under the trademark Astro*Carto*Graphy.
Another Astrological Cartography system is named "local space astrology," developed by German astrologer Friedrich Sieggrün and later popularized in the United States by Steve Cozzi and astrological software developer Michael Erlewine.

Astrological geomancy
Astrological Geomancy is any approach to examine and understand the astrological qualities of places.
In astrological geomancy places are studied not through projections from maps like in astrogeography but through consideration of the microcosmic system of a place.
The surroundings, the use, animals and plants, features of buildings and architecture, events and all possible features of places can be evaluated in astrological geomancy but the most important element would be the landscape.
A highly elaborate system of astrological geomancy was developed and published by G. Stockhorst between 1995 and 2010. The system is based on fields of 30 square meters for a basic grid system with the sequence of zodiac signs running from north to south and west to east so that one full zodiac length can be measured as 360 m long in both directions. The use of a holographic structural model in which 12 x 12 square 30 m fields make one 360 square m field, 12 x 12 360 square m fields make one 4,32 km field, 12 x 12 4,32 km fields make one 51,84 km field and 12 x 12 51,84 km fields make one 622,08 km field allows mapping of villages, towns and regions through projection onto maps and the use for verification in astrogeographic mapping.
In Chinese geomancy (feng shui) astrological signs, symbols and categories have been traditionally used.

See also
Astrocartography

References

Astrology by type